Domenico Francia (1702–1758) was an Italian painter and architect.

He was born in Bologna, the son of the engraver Francesco Maria Domenico Francia, and studied under Ferdinando Galli (called Bibiena), whom he assisted in his paintings at Vienna. He was afterwards appointed builder to the King of Sweden, and on the expiration of this service painted at other European courts.

Notes
 

1702 births
1758 deaths
18th-century Italian painters
Italian male painters
18th-century Italian architects
Artists from Bologna
Court painters
Architects from Bologna
18th-century Italian male artists